Siadło may refer to the following places in Police County, West Pomeranian Voivodeship, Poland:

Siadło Dolne
Siadło Górne